Enrique Aquino Busquets (born 1 May 1950) is a Mexican long-distance runner. He competed in the men's 5000 metres and 10,000 metres at the 1980 Summer Olympics.

References

External links
 

1950 births
Living people
Athletes (track and field) at the 1980 Summer Olympics
Mexican male long-distance runners
Olympic athletes of Mexico
Place of birth missing (living people)
Pan American Games medalists in athletics (track and field)
Pan American Games silver medalists for Mexico
Athletes (track and field) at the 1979 Pan American Games
Universiade silver medalists for Mexico
Universiade bronze medalists for Mexico
Universiade medalists in athletics (track and field)
Medalists at the 1979 Summer Universiade
Medalists at the 1979 Pan American Games
Central American and Caribbean Games medalists in athletics
Central American and Caribbean Games silver medalists for Mexico
Competitors at the 1982 Central American and Caribbean Games
20th-century Mexican people
21st-century Mexican people